The 2003–04 Syracuse Orangemen men's basketball team represented Syracuse University in NCAA men's basketball competition in the 2003–04 Division I season. The head coach was Jim Boeheim, serving for his 28th year. The team played its home games at the Carrier Dome in Syracuse, New York.  The team finished with a 23–8 (11–5) record, while making it to the Sweet 16 round of the NCAA tournament. The team was led by junior Hakim Warrick and sophomore Gerry McNamara. Senior Jeremy McNeil, juniors Craig Forth and Josh Pace and sophomore Billy Edelin were also major contributors.

This was the last season for Syracuse men's basketball under the Orangemen nickname. (At that time, women's teams and athletes were known as "Orangewomen".) Effective with the 2004–05 academic year, the school nickname became "Orange" for both men and women.

Roster
Hakim Warrick (19.8 ppg, 8.7 rpg)
Gerry McNamara (17.2 ppg, 3.8 apg)
Billy Edelin (13.8 ppg, 5.2 apg)
Josh Pace (9.5 ppg, 5.3 rpg)
Craig Forth (5.7 ppg, 5.8 rpg)
Demetris Nichols (4.2 ppg, 2.2 rpg)
Louie McCroskey (3.9 ppg, 2.2 rpg)
Jeremy McNeil (3.0 ppg, 2.7 rpg)
Terrence Roberts (2.1 ppg, 2.0 rpg)

Developments
Syracuse would eventually lose in the Sweet 16 round to Alabama.
McNamara scored 43 points on 11-of-17 shooting from the floor, as Syracuse topped Brigham Young, 80–75, in the second round of the NCAA Tournament.
Syracuse handed Pittsburgh its first ever loss at the Peterson Center, 46–49 (OT), on a buzzer-beater in overtime by McNamara, and also concluded its regular season by topping Connecticut, 67–56, which would go on to win the National Championship.
Billy Edelin played just 17 games and left the team for undisclosed reasons in January.
Syracuse lost would-be sophomore Carmelo Anthony to the NBA Draft (3rd to the Denver Nuggets) and Kueth Duany to graduation.

References

Syracuse Orange
Syracuse Orange men's basketball seasons
Syracuse Orange men's b
Syracuse Orange men's b
Syracuse